South Broads Lifeboat Station was an RNLI operated lifeboat station located on Oulton Broad in the town of Lowestoft in the English county of Suffolk. The station operated between 2001 and 2011. The station performed 194 rescues.

Closure
The RNLI decided to close the station in January 2011 after a review which recommended that lifesaving across The Broads would be more effectively covered from Great Yarmouth and Gorleston Lifeboat Station. Following the closure in November 2011, the station's  and  lifeboats were added to the RNLI's relief fleet and its 4x4 vehicle transferred to Great Yarmouth and Gorleston.

Fleet

D-class

XP-class

References

Lowestoft
Lifeboat stations in Suffolk